The 1919 Tasmanian state election was held on 31 May 1919. Since the previous election, the Liberal Party had absorbed conscriptionist Labor defectors to become the Nationalist Party.

Retiring Members

Nationalist
Frederick Burbury MHA (Franklin)
William Fullerton MHA (Denison)

House of Assembly
Sitting members are shown in bold text. Tickets that elected at least one MHA are highlighted in the relevant colour. Successful candidates are indicated by an asterisk (*).

Bass
Six seats were up for election. The Labor Party was defending two seats. The Nationalist Party was defending four seats.

Darwin
Six seats were up for election. The Labor Party was defending two seats. The Nationalist Party was defending three seats. Independent MHA Joshua Whitsitt was defending one seat.

Denison
Six seats were up for election. The Labor Party was defending two seats. The Nationalist Party was defending four seats.

Franklin
Six seats were up for election. The Labor Party was defending two seats. The Nationalist Party was defending four seats.

Wilmot
Six seats were up for election. The Labor Party was defending two seats. The Nationalist Party was defending four seats.

See also
 Members of the Tasmanian House of Assembly, 1916–1919
 Members of the Tasmanian House of Assembly, 1919–1922

References
Tasmanian Parliamentary Library

Candidates for Tasmanian state elections